The 1962 Five Nations Championship was the thirty-third series of the rugby union Five Nations Championship. Including the previous incarnations as the Home Nations and Five Nations, this was the sixty-eighth series of the northern hemisphere rugby union championship. Ten matches were played between 13 January and 17 November. It was contested by England, France, Ireland, Scotland and Wales.

A smallpox epidemic in South Wales in March and April caused the match between Ireland and Wales to be postponed until November 1962.

Participants
The teams involved were:

Table

Results

References

External links

The official RBS Six Nations Site

Six Nations Championship seasons
Five Nations
Five Nations
Five Nations
Five Nations
Five Nations
Five Nations
Five Nations
Five Nations
Five Nations
Five Nations
Five Nations